PLOS Clinical Trials was a scientific journal covering randomized trials from all medical and public health disciplines. It has been discontinued and is now rolled into PLOS ONE.

External links
 PLOS Clinical Trials homepage

Creative Commons Attribution-licensed journals
Open access journals
General medical journals
PLOS academic journals
Publications established in 2006
Publications disestablished in 2007
Defunct journals